Benjamin Peter Robert Williams (born 28 October 1993) is an English former first-class cricketer.

Williams was born at Plymouth in October 1993. He was educated at Mount Kelly School, before going up to Durham University. While studying at Durham, he made a single appearance in first-class cricket for Durham MCCU against Durham in 2015. Williams batted twice in the match, being dismissed without scoring by Scott Borthwick in the Durham MCCU first innings, while in their second innings he was unbeaten without scoring. With his left-arm medium-fast bowling, he took a single wicket, that of Mark Stoneman. In addition to playing first-class cricket, Williams has also played minor counties cricket for Devon in 2015.

References

External links

1993 births
Living people
Cricketers from Plymouth, Devon
People educated at Kelly College
Alumni of Durham University
English cricketers
Durham MCCU cricketers
Devon cricketers